Sperl is a surname. Notable people with the surname include:

 Andreas Sperl, CFO of aircraft manufacturer Airbus
 Johann Sperl (1840–1914), German painter
 Milan Šperl (born 1980), Czech cross-country skier
 Natalie Denise Sperl (born 1979), Austrian-American model and actress

See also
 Timothy Farrell (1922–1989), American actor, born Timothy Sperl
 Café Sperl, Mariahilf, Vienna
 Sperling

German-language surnames